SLNS Jayasagara (P-601) (Jayasagara, in Sinhalese: Sea of victory) is an Offshore Patrol Vessel (OPV) of the Sri Lanka Navy. It was the lead ship of the locally built Jayasagara class. She served as the flagship of the fleet in the 1980s and 1990s.

Operations
Since joining the Sri Lankan fleet in 1983, she served as its flagship and was deployed for patrolling the coastal water around Sri Lanka. Due to this she was attached to the 7th Surveillance Command Squadron. During the Sri Lankan Civil War, Jayesagara was involved in anti-arms smuggling patrols and maritime surveillance. In 2004 she took part in a joint naval exercise with the Indian Coast Guard. Since the end of the civil war she has engaged in search and rescue missions in the Indian Ocean.

In October 2021, SLNS Jayasagara relinquishes her service in the Navy and handed over to the Sri Lanka Coast Guard

References

Suranimala brings “Angelo” home safely
Victory pageant of Tri-Forces

External links
Sri Lanka Navy

Ships of the Sri Lanka Navy
1983 ships
Ships built in Colombo